Williams Gateway may refer to:

 Phoenix Mesa Gateway Airport, which was formerly named Williams Gateway Airport
 Williams Gateway Freeway, a proposed freeway in Metropolitan Phoenix